Robert Makharashvili (born 6 October 1981) is a Georgian alpine skier. He competed in the men's slalom at the 2002 Winter Olympics.

References

1981 births
Living people
Male alpine skiers from Georgia (country)
Olympic alpine skiers of Georgia (country)
Alpine skiers at the 2002 Winter Olympics
Sportspeople from Tbilisi